Mantis octospilota, common name eight-spotted mantis or blackbarred mantis, is a species of praying mantis found in Australia. As its common name suggests, it is primarily identified by the eight black spots along the dorsal surface of its abdomen.

See also
List of mantis genera and species

References

octospilota
Mantodea of Oceania
Insects of Australia
Insects described in 1889